Utah is divided into 4 congressional districts, each represented by a member of the United States House of Representatives. After the 2010 census, Utah gained one House seat, and a new map was approved by the state legislature and signed into law by Governor Gary Herbert.

Current districts and representatives
List of members of the United States House delegation from Utah, district boundaries, and the district political ratings according to the CPVI. The delegation has a total of four members, all Republicans.

Historical and present district boundaries
Table of United States congressional district boundary maps in the State of Utah, presented chronologically. All redistricting events that took place in Utah between 1973 and 2013 are shown.

Redistricting ballot measures 

 2018 Utah Proposition 4, a measure that would require the redistricting process to be done by a bipartisan commission. Passed by a margin of just 0.68%.
 2008 Utah Legislative Redistricting Requirement, Amendment D, a technical proposal that allowed the legislature to consider redistricting once census data was made public. Passed by a margin of 56.50%.

Obsolete districts
Utah Territory's at-large congressional district
Utah's at-large congressional district

References

See also
United States congressional delegations from Utah
List of United States congressional districts
Utah State Legislative districts